Arbun is a rural locality (an ulus) in Kurumkansky District, Republic of Buryatia, Russia. The population was 8 as of 2010.

Geography 
Arbun is located 51 km east of Kurumkan (the district's administrative centre) by road. Amatkhan is the nearest rural locality.

References 

Rural localities in Kurumkansky District